Gülden Kayalar Kuzubaşıoğlu (née Kayalar, born 5 December 1980 in Samsun, Turkey) is a Turkish volleyball player. She plays for Eczacıbaşı Zentiva since 2003 and wears the number 2. She also played for Ankara Numunespor, Şanlıurfa Gençlikspor.

Career
"I started playing volleyball in elementary school in Samsun at the age of eight", is how she describes the start of her career. Her first club team was Ladikspor. After Ladikspor she transferred to Samsun Atakum and DSI Spor before playing for the first division team Şanlıurfa Gençlikspor (2002–03). Then she signed a contract with Ankara Numunespor. At the beginning of the preparation phase for the European Championships, Gülden was chosen (out of a selection of many experienced libero players) as a candidate for the libero position in the national team. To her surprise, and to the amazement of many volleyball authorities, the national team coaches chose her to represent the Turkish colours in the European Championships 2002-03. Gülden tried her utmost to deserve this honor. "Being a part of the National Team means everything to me. I was very excited as I was just at the beginning of my career and was so afraid of not being successful. My team mates were very understanding and supportive. At the first national camp there were already two liberos and I did not expect to be chosen for the team. However, when they finally announced my selection, I was extremely excited'''' she said.

During her first international appearance at the 23rd European Championships she demonstrated her defensive strengths with some great actions, thus becoming a very effective weapon and the mascot of the national team of Turkey. At the end of the EC she was declared the best digger of the tournament. Although having lost the final to Poland, it has nevertheless been Turkey’s biggest success in the history of the European Championships.

Clubs
 Eczacıbaşı VitrA (2003–2011)

Awards

Individuals
 2003 European Championship "Best Digger" 2005 European Championship "Best Receiver" 2012 FIVB World Grand Prix "Best Receiver" 2012-13 Turkish League Final Series "Best Libero"''

Clubs
 2010-11 Turkish Cup -  Champion, with Eczacıbaşı VitrA
 2011 Turkish Volleyball Super Cup -  Champion, with Eczacıbaşı VitrA
 2011-12 Turkish Cup -  Champion, with Eczacıbaşı VitrA
 2011-12 Aroma Women's Volleyball League -  Runner-Up, with Eczacıbaşı VitrA
 2012 Turkish Volleyball Super Cup -  Champion, with Eczacıbaşı VitrA
 2012-2013 Turkish Women's Volleyball Cup -  Runner-Up, with Eczacıbaşı VitrA
 2012-2013 Turkish Women's Volleyball League -  Runner-Up, with Eczacıbaşı VitrA
 2016 FIVB Club World Championship -  Champion, with Eczacıbaşı VitrA

National team
 2003 European Championship -  Silver Medal
 2009 European League -  Silver Medal
 2012 FIVB World Grand Prix -  Bronze Medal

External links
 
 
 
 

1980 births
Living people
Sportspeople from Samsun
Turkish women's volleyball players
Eczacıbaşı volleyball players
Olympic volleyball players of Turkey
Volleyball players at the 2012 Summer Olympics
Mediterranean Games gold medalists for Turkey
Mediterranean Games medalists in volleyball
Competitors at the 2005 Mediterranean Games